Battle of Podhajce took place on 8–9 September 1698 near Podhajce in Ruthenian Voivodship during the Great Turkish War. 6000-strong Polish army under Field Crown Hetman Feliks Kazimierz Potocki repelled a 14,000 man Tatar expedition under Qaplan I Giray. Lack of sufficient number of light cavalry on the Polish side prevented a successful pursuit of Tatars and their captives.

It was the last Polish-Tatar battle ever and the last Polish battle of the Great Turkish War: only months later the Treaty of Karlowitz was signed.

Sources
 (1762) Modern History being a Continuation of Universal History: History of Poland (Volume 34 of Modern History) London, pages 302-303

Podhajce 1698
Podhajce 1698
Podhajce
1698 in Europe
Polish–Ottoman wars
Podhajce 1698

hu:Podhajcei csata#Második csata